Tegenaria annulata is a species of funnel-web spiders found in Bosnia-Herzegovina, Croatia, Montenegro and Serbia.

See also 
 List of Agelenidae species

References

External links 

annulata
Spiders of Europe
Spiders described in 1913